Oleksandr Sergiyovich Pyatnytsya (born 14 July 1985 in Dnipropetrovsk) is a male javelin thrower from Ukraine. His personal best is 86.12 metres, achieved in May 2012 in Kiev, which was a new national record.

Career
He won the bronze medal at the 2007 European U23 Championships and finished fifth at the 2009 World Athletics Final. He also competed at the 2009 and 2011 World Championships without reaching the final.

He initially was awarded the silver medal in the javelin throw at the 2012 London Olympics with a throw of 84.51m. In 2016 a reanalysis of samples from the 2012 Olympics resulted in a positive test for the anabolic steroid turinabol. He was stripped of his title by the IOC and ordered to return his silver medal, medalist pin and diploma.

In May 2017, he was disqualified for two years.

Achievements

Seasonal bests by year
2007 - 76.28
2008 - 78.54
2009 - 81.96
2010 - 84.11
2011 - 82.61
2012 - 86.12
2013 - 77.46
2014 - 81.10
2015 - 81.63

References

External links

1985 births
Living people
Sportspeople from Dnipro
Armed Forces sports society (Ukraine) athletes
Ukrainian male javelin throwers
Athletes (track and field) at the 2012 Summer Olympics
Athletes (track and field) at the 2016 Summer Olympics
Olympic athletes of Ukraine
Doping cases in athletics
Ukrainian sportspeople in doping cases
Competitors stripped of Summer Olympics medals